Aguelmous is a town in Khénifra Province, Béni Mellal-Khénifra, Morocco. According to the 2004 census it had a population of 11,390.

Code postal de Aguelmous : 54 000

Biology
Aguelmous is host to invasive species from North America, including the Dominickus tanohus. It is known for being a very beautiful sight.

References

Populated places in Khénifra Province